The Roman emperors were the rulers of the Roman Empire from the granting of the name and title Augustus to Octavian by the Roman Senate in 27 BC onward. Augustus maintained a facade of Republican rule, rejecting monarchical titles but calling himself princeps senatus (first man of the Senate) and princeps civitatis (first citizen of the state). The title of Augustus was conferred on his successors to the imperial position, and emperors gradually grew more monarchical and authoritarian.

The style of government instituted by Augustus is called the Principate and continued until the late third or early fourth century. The modern word "emperor" derives from the title imperator, that was granted by an army to a successful general; during the initial phase of the empire, the title was generally used only by the princeps. For example, Augustus's official name was Imperator Caesar Divi Filius Augustus. The territory under command of the emperor had developed under the period of the Roman Republic as it invaded and occupied much of Europe and portions of North Africa and the Middle East. Under the republic, the Senate and People of Rome authorized provincial governors, who answered only to them, to rule regions of the empire. The chief magistrates of the republic were two consuls elected each year; consuls continued to be elected in the imperial period, but their authority was subservient to that of the emperor, who also controlled and determined their election. Often, the emperors themselves, or close family, were selected as consul.

After the Crisis of the Third Century, Diocletian increased the authority of the emperor and adopted the title "dominus noster" (our lord). The rise of powerful barbarian tribes along the borders of the empire, the challenge they posed to the defense of far-flung borders as well as an unstable imperial succession led Diocletian to divide the administration of the Empire geographically with a co-augustus in 286. In 330, Constantine the Great, the emperor who accepted Christianity, established a second capital in Byzantium, which he renamed Constantinople. Historians consider the Dominate period of the empire to have begun with either Diocletian or Constantine, depending on the author. For most of the period from 286 to 480, there was more than one recognized senior emperor, with the division usually based on geographic regions. This division was consistently in place after the death of Theodosius I in 395, which historians have dated as the division between the Western Roman Empire and the Eastern Roman Empire. However, formally the Empire remained a single polity, with separate co-emperors in the separate courts.

The fall of the Western Roman Empire is dated either from the de facto date of 476, when Romulus Augustulus was deposed by the Germanic Herulians led by Odoacer, or the de jure date of 480, on the death of Julius Nepos, when Eastern emperor Zeno ended recognition of a separate Western court. Historians typically refer to the empire in the centuries that followed as the "Byzantine Empire", orientated toward Hellenic culture and governed by the Byzantine emperors. Given that "Byzantine" is a later historiographical designation and the inhabitants and emperors of the empire continually maintained Roman identity, this designation is not used universally and continues to be a subject of specialist debate. Under Justinian I, in the sixth century, a large portion of the western empire was retaken, including Italy, Africa, and part of Spain. Over the course of the centuries thereafter, most of the imperial territories were lost, which eventually restricted the empire to Anatolia and the Balkans. The line of emperors continued until the death of Constantine XI Palaiologos at the fall of Constantinople in 1453, when the remaining territories were conquered by the Ottoman Turks led by Sultan Mehmed II. In the aftermath of the conquest, Mehmed II proclaimed himself kayser-i Rûm ("Caesar of the Romans"), thus claiming to be the new emperor, a claim maintained by succeeding sultans. Competing claims of succession to the Roman Empire have also been forwarded by various other states and empires, and by numerous later pretenders.

Legitimacy 

While the imperial government of the Roman Empire was rarely called into question during its five centuries in the west and fifteen centuries in the east, individual emperors often faced unending challenges in the form of usurpation and perpetual civil wars. From the rise of Augustus, the first Roman emperor, in 27 BC to the sack of Rome in AD 455, there were over a hundred usurpations or attempted usurpations (an average of one usurpation or attempt about every four years). From the murder of Commodus in 192 until the fifth century, there was scarcely a single decade without succession conflicts and civil war. Very few emperors died of natural causes, with regicide in practical terms having become the expected end of a Roman emperor by late antiquity. The distinction between a usurper and a legitimate emperor is a blurry one, given that a large number of emperors commonly considered legitimate began their rule as usurpers, revolting against the previous legitimate emperor.

True legitimizing structures and theories were weak, or wholly absent, in the Roman Empire, and there were no true objective legal criteria for being acclaimed emperor beyond acceptance by the Roman army. Dynastic succession was not legally formalized, but also not uncommon, with powerful rulers sometimes succeeding in passing power on to their children or other relatives. While dynastic ties could bring someone to the throne, they were not a guarantee that their rule would not be challenged. With the exception of Titus (79–81; son of Vespasian), no son of an emperor who ruled after the death of their father died a natural death until Constantine I in 337. Control of Rome itself and approval of the Roman Senate held some importance as legitimising factors, but were mostly symbolic. Emperors who began their careers as usurpers had often been deemed public enemies by the senate before they managed to take the city. Emperors did not need to be acclaimed or crowned in Rome itself, as demonstrated in the Year of the Four Emperors (69), when claimants were crowned by armies in the Roman provinces, and the senate's role in legitimising emperors had almost faded into insignificance by the Crisis of the Third Century (235–285). By the end of the third century, Rome's importance was mainly ideological, with several emperors and usurpers even beginning to place their court in other cities in the empire, closer to the imperial frontier.

Common methods used by emperors to assert claims of legitimacy, such as proclamation by the army, blood connections (sometimes fictitious) to past emperors, wearing imperial regalia, distributing one's own coins or statues and claims to pre-eminent virtue through propaganda, were pursued just as well by many usurpers as they were by legitimate emperors. There were no constitutional or legal distinctions that differentiated legitimate emperors and usurpers. In ancient Roman texts, the differences between emperors and "tyrants" (the term typically used for usurpers) is often a moral one (with the tyrants ascribed wicked behaviour) rather than a legal one. Typically, the actual distinction was whether the claimant had been victorious or not. In the Historia Augusta, an ancient Roman collection of imperial biographies, the usurper Pescennius Niger (193–194) is expressly noted to only be a tyrant because he was defeated by Septimius Severus (193–211). This is also followed in modern historiography, where, in the absence of constitutional criteria separating them, the main factor that distinguishes usurpers from legitimate Roman emperors is their degree of success. What makes a figure who began as a usurper into a legitimate emperor is typically either that they managed to gain the recognition from a more senior, legitimate, emperor, or that they managed to defeat a more senior, legitimate emperor and seize power from them by force.

List inclusion criteria 
Given that a concept of constitutional legitimacy was irrelevant in the Roman Empire, and emperors were only 'legitimate' in so far as they were able to be accepted in the wider empire, this list of emperors operates on a collection of inclusion criteria:

 Imperial claimants whose power across the empire became, or from the beginning was, absolute and who ruled undisputed are treated as legitimate emperors. From 286 onward, when imperial power was usually divided among two colleagues in the east and west, control over the respective half is sufficient even if a claimant was not recognized in the other half, such as was the case for several of the last few emperors in the west.
 Imperial claimants who were proclaimed emperors by another, legitimate, senior emperor, or who were recognized by a legitimate senior emperor, are treated as legitimate emperors. Many emperors ruled alongside one or various joint-emperors. However, and specially from the 4th century onwards, most of these were children who never ruled in their own right. Scholars of the later Empire always omit these rulers, but the same is not always applied during the early Empire. For the purposes of consistency, later senior emperors' tenures as co-emperors are not counted as part of their reign. The list also gives all co-emperors their own entry only up to the 4th century.
 Imperial claimants who achieved the recognition of the Roman Senate, especially in times of uncertainty and civil war, are, due to the senate's nominal role as an elective body, treated as legitimate emperors. In later times, especially when emperors ruled from other cities, this criterion defaults to the possession and control of Rome itself. In the later eastern empire, possession of the capital of Constantinople was an essential element of imperial legitimacy.
In the case of non-dynastic emperors after or in the middle of the rule of a dynasty, it is customary among historians to group them together with the rulers of said dynasty, an approach that is followed in this list. Dynastic breaks with non-dynastic rulers are indicated with thickened horizontal lines.

Principate (27 BC – AD 284)

Julio-Claudian dynasty (27 BC – AD 68)

Year of the Four Emperors (68–69)

Flavian dynasty (69–96)

Nerva–Antonine dynasty (96–192)

Year of the Five Emperors (193) 

Note: The other claimants during the Year of the Five Emperors were Pescennius Niger and Clodius Albinus, generally regarded as usurpers.

Severan dynasty (193–235)

Crisis of the Third Century (235–285)

Dominate (284–476)

Tetrarchy (284–324)

Constantinian dynasty (306–363)

Valentinianic dynasty (364–392)

Theodosian dynasty (379–457)

Last western emperors (455–476)

Later eastern emperors (457–1453)

Leonid dynasty (457–518)

Justinian dynasty (518–602)

Heraclian dynasty (610–695)

Twenty Years' Anarchy (695–717)

Isaurian dynasty (717–802)

Nikephorian dynasty (802–813)

Amorian dynasty (820–867)

Macedonian dynasty (867–1056)

Doukas dynasty (1059–1078)

Komnenos dynasty (1081–1185)

Angelos dynasty (1185–1204)

Laskaris dynasty (1205–1261) 

Note: Roman rule in Constantinople was interrupted with the capture of the city by the Fourth Crusade in 1204. Though the crusaders created a new line of Latin emperors in the city, modern historians recognize the line of emperors of the Laskaris dynasty, reigning in Nicaea, as the legitimate Roman emperors during this period as the Nicene Empire eventually retook Constantinople. For other lines of claimant emperors, see List of Trapezuntine emperors and List of Thessalonian emperors.

Palaiologos dynasty (1259–1453)

See also 
 List of Roman and Byzantine empresses – for the consorts of the emperors
 List of Roman usurpers – for a list of unsuccessful claimants to the position of emperor (41–470)
 List of Byzantine usurpers – for a list of unsuccessful claimants to the position of emperor (479–1448)
 List of Roman dynasties – for a list of the many dynasties that ruled the Roman Empire
 List of Roman consuls – for a list of the consuls who held power during the Roman Republic and who continued to be appointed in imperial times
 List of Roman dictators – for a list of dictators during the Roman Republic
 Family tree of Roman emperors – for a concise family tree of emperors and their immediate family (27 BC–518 AD)
 Family tree of Byzantine emperors – for a concise family tree of emperors and their immediate family (337–1453)

Notes

References

Citations

Main bibliography

Secondary bibliography

External links

"The Rulers of the Roman Empire". De Imperatoribus Romanis

Government of the Roman Empire
Roman emperors
Emperors